Roads with highway names in Australia are roads that are usually, but not necessarily, classified as a highway by a state or territory road authority. There are also many roads classified as a highway, but without a highway name. For example, Great Southern Highway is classified as a main road, not as a highway, or Hereward Highway in the Sydney suburb of Blacktown which is a two lane suburban street with the name Highway, while the King Georges Road is classified as a highway, but does not have the word "Highway" in its name. There are a number of freeways in Australia, or freeway-standard roads, which may or may not be classified as highways, and may or may not be named as highways.

This list contains all roads that satisfy one of the following criteria:
 Are named as a highway, motorway or freeway
 Are classified as a highway, but without a highway, motorway or freeway name

A

B

C

D

E

F

G

H

I

K

L

M

N

O

P

R

S

T

V

W

Y

Z

See also

State and territory listings
List of highways in New South Wales
List of highways in Victoria
List of highways in Queensland
List of highways in South Australia
List of highways in Western Australia
List of highways in Tasmania
List of highways in the Northern Territory

Other articles about transport in Australia

Highways in Australia
Transport in Australia
Road transport in Australia
List of roads and highways
List of freeways in Australia
List of Australian airports
List of Australian ports

Notes

References

 
Hig